Čiginj is a settlement south of Volče in the Municipality of Tolmin in the Littoral region of Slovenia.

History
During the Second World War, the Italian authorities operated a concentration camp at Čiginj before the Gonars concentration camp was established.

References

External links 

Čiginj on Geopedia

Populated places in the Municipality of Tolmin